Immunocomputing explores the principles of information processing that proteins and immune networks utilize in order to solve specific complex problems while protected from viruses, noise, errors and intrusions.

It intends to establish:

 A proper mathematical framework
 A new kind of computing
 A new kind of hardware

The main difference with other kinds of computing lay on the function of its basic element, the formal protein, defined according with its biological prototype and its mathematical model. 

The main biophysical issues considered in immunocomputing are:

 Free folding to a stable state (inspiration for the Formal Protein)
 Free binding with other elements dependent on their reciprocal states (inspiration for the Formal Immune Networks)

Formal immune networks (FINs) have as closest model the idiotypic network of N. Jerne but they consider specific mechanisms of interactions between proteins. FINs are able to learn, recognize and solve problems.

Artificial immune systems
Biophysics
Cognitive science